George Woodcock,  (20 October 1904 – 30 October 1979) was a British trade unionist and general secretary of the Trades Union Congress from 1960 to 1969.

Born and brought up in Bamber Bridge, Lancashire, he started work at age 12 in the local cotton mill. He became, in 1924, an official of the Bamber Bridge and District Weavers' Union. He was also active in the Independent Labour Party and the Labour Party. In 1929 he won a TUC scholarship to Ruskin College, Oxford, in 1929. Having distinguished himself at undergraduate and postgraduate level, and following two years in the civil service, Woodcock joined the TUC in 1936 as head of the research and economic department. Here, Woodcock was much influenced by leading moderates in the trade union movement, such as Walter Citrine and Ernest Bevin, and also by the economic ideas of John Maynard Keynes.

In 1947 he became the TUC's Assistant General Secretary and in 1960, was appointed General Secretary, serving in that position until 1969. In 1970 Woodcock was a candidate for the Chancellorship of the University of Kent at Canterbury, but lost to Jo Grimond.

References

George Goodman, "Woodcock, George, (1904–1979), trade unionist", Oxford Dictionary of National Biography

External links
Catalogue of Woodcock's papers, held at the Modern Records Centre, University of Warwick

1904 births
1979 deaths
General Secretaries of the Trades Union Congress
Members of the Privy Council of the United Kingdom
Alumni of Ruskin College
People from Bamber Bridge
People from Epsom
Honorary Fellows of the London School of Economics